Ismet Jashari (16 April 1967 – 25 August 1998) also known as Commander Kumanova, was an Albanian commander of the Kosovo Liberation Army (KLA) who was killed on 25 August 1998 during the fighting with Serbian forces in Klečke, Kosovo. The Ismet Jashari-Kumanova Brigade of the KLA was named in his memory. After the Kosovo War, he was declared Hero of Kosovo.

Jashari had left Switzerland where he lived to join the Kosovo Liberation Army (KLA) to fight against Serbian military and police forces under the command of former Serbian President Slobodan Milosevic.

Early life 
Ismet was born on April 16, 1967, in the village of Orizari in the Karadak Highlands of the Municipality of Lipkovo. 

From his father's side, the Jashari family migrated to Macedonia in the early 1910s from Vranje in south-Serbia when there were a significant minority of ethnic Albanians living there. His mother came from the Emini family of Lipkovo near Kumanovo in Macedonia.

He completed primary school in his hometown to continue his secondary education in Kumanovo, Macedonia.

During the 80s and 90s Ismet Jashari was active on promoting democracy and freedom in the Communist Federation of Yugoslavia, these actions had him arrested several times and also the main factor which made him flee to Switzerland where he worked with construction.

He completed primary school in his hometown to continue his secondary education in Kumanovo.

Ismet Jashari has two brothers and five sisters. One of the brothers is Jemail Jashari who is an MP in the Macedonian Parliament today, representing the Albanian political party BDI (Bashkimi Demokratik për Integrim). The second brother is Murat Jashari who was arrested for illegal weapon trade during the Kosovo Wars by Swiss authorities.

Kosovo War 
Ismet Jashari joined the KLA after the Prekaz massacre on 7 March 1998. On March 11, he, together with other KLA leaders such as Fehmi Lladrovci, Bekim Berisha and Fatmir Limaj entered  the Drenica valley, where the KLA  was operating against the VJ. Later that month, the General Staff of the KLA, assigned Ismet Jashari as commander in the Llapusha region.

In Late March 1998, Ismet Jashari, together with Fatmir Limaj, formed the "Celiku" unit, which was based in Kleçka.

In April 1998, Ismet Jashari was ambushed by Yugoslav forces between the villages of Volljakë and Çupevë, while he was returning to Kleçka from leading military operations in Klina and Dukagjin. Ismet Jashari survived the ambush, but was wounded in both legs.

On May 9, 1998, Ismet Jashari, who still had not fully recovered from the injuries he suffered during the ambush, led his forces into Llapushnik, where he defeated the Yugoslav Army and police and captured the town.

After occupying Llapushnik, Ismet Jashari led further operations against Yugoslav forces, defeating them in multible battles and capturing the strategically important sites of Duhla Pass and Carraleva Gorge.

From beginning of May to August 1998, Ismet Jashari reinforced strategic sites in southern Drenica, Llapushnik and the Duhla Pass for an upcoming Yugoslav Offensive.

On 14 June 1998, Yugoslav forces attacked and captured the Carraleva Gorge and the Duhla Pass, held by Ismet Jashari's forces, three days later Ismet Jashari counterattacked the VJ, who were preparing to penetrate towards Luzhnica. Ismet Jashari managed to recapture the Carraleva Gorge, forcing the VJ to withdraw back to their positions in the Duhla Pass. At the end of June 1998, Ismet Jashari fortied his positions in Carraleva, Zborca, Blinaja, Fushtica, Terpeza, Bllaca and everywhere in the territories, that were under the control of the KLA in south Drenica and Llapusha.

In August 1998, Ismet Jashari attacked and defeated VJ units at several occasions, such as in Shtëpia e Pylltarit, Ura e Sahitit and in the village of Belinc. During a major Yugoslav offensive on 25 and 26 July 1998, Ismet Jashari's forces fought battles with the VJ in Llapushnik, Zborc and the Carraleva Gorge, but were not able to hold these strategic sites.

On 23 August 1998, Yugoslav forces marched towards Kleçka, where the General Staff of the KLA was also located, but were met by Ismet Jashari's forces in Luzhnica, who held off the VJ from penetrating towards Kleçka for an entire day, while being heavily outnumbered. On 24 August 1998, the VJ had increased their offensive by attacking Ismet Jashari's forces with large-caliber cannons and surface-to-surface missiles, ultimately succeeding in driving the KLA out of Luzhnica and capturing Kleçka. One day later on 25 August, Ismet Jashari had launched a surprise counterattack in an attempt to retrieve the bodies of the fallen soldiers. After several hours of close combat in Luzhnica, Ismet Jashari fell in Battle.

Death 
On August 25, 1998, while fighting with Serbian Forces, Ismet Jashari was killed. On August 25, 2009, Jashari was posthumously awarded the Hero of Kosovo award.

Legacy 
In 2001, the 113th NLA Brigade was established under his name during the 2001 Insurgency in Macedonia. In 2011 a monument dedicated to him was inaugurated in Lipkovo Municipality, Republic of Macedonia.

Notes

References

20th-century Albanian military personnel
1998 deaths
Albanians in North Macedonia
Albanian nationalists
People from Lipkovo Municipality
Kosovo Liberation Army soldiers
1967 births